The Société des établissements de plein air du Québec (English: Quebec Outdoor Establishments Company), also known as Sépaq, is the agency of the Government of Quebec that manages parks and wildlife reserves. Sépaq falls under the authority of the Minister of Développement durable, de l'Environnement et des Parcs (Sustainable development, Environment and Parks) and its head office is located in Quebec City. It employs about 3400 people.

Sépaq is organized into 3 divisions called "networks":
 Parcs Québec - manages 23 provincial parks ("national" parks, as they are called in Quebec) that are officially recognized as protected areas. Parcs Québec works to ensure the protection and preservation of these significant ecosystems, where low-impact activities such as hiking, canoeing and camping are preferred while protecting sensitive zones and keeping environmental impacts to a minimum.
 Réserves fauniques (Wildlife reserves) - manages 15 wildlife reserves in forested and wilderness areas. These areas are dedicated to the conservation, promotion, and use of wildlife resources, and, secondarily, to the practice of outdoor recreational activities. They are not considered protected areas under the criteria of the IUCN.
 Centres touristique (Tourist centres) - manages 9 tourist resorts. This network preserves and promotes certain historical sites and tourism facilities.

Sépaq also manages  of Anticosti Island as a separate division not part of the other networks. Sépaq Anticosti promotes tourism on the island, particularly hunting and fishing tours.

See also
List of protected areas of Quebec - list of national parks and reserves in Quebec, including those under management by Sépaq.

References

External links
Sépaq (Parcs Québec) official site

Parks in Quebec
Quebec government departments and agencies
Land management
Parks services